Last Call for Blackford Oakes is a 2005 Blackford Oakes novel by William F. Buckley, Jr.

It is the final of the 11 novels in the Blackford Oakes series.

Plot
CIA agent Blackford Oakes confronts Kim Philby, a British double agent who defected to the Soviet Union, in 1987.

References

2005 American novels
Blackford Oakes novels
Fiction set in 1987
Novels set in the 1980s
American spy novels
English-language novels